Farzad Baher Arasbaran (born 1993) is an Iranian sabre fencer and was also a member of the Iranian sabre fence in 2013 Budapest and 2014 Kazan.

References

 
 
 

Iranian male sabre fencers
Living people
1993 births
Sportspeople from Tabriz
Fencers at the 2014 Asian Games
Fencers at the 2018 Asian Games
Asian Games silver medalists for Iran
Asian Games medalists in fencing
Medalists at the 2014 Asian Games
Medalists at the 2018 Asian Games
Universiade medalists in fencing
Universiade silver medalists for Iran
Medalists at the 2017 Summer Universiade
21st-century Iranian people